"Darling Darling" is the second single released by Hitomi Yaida in the UK. It was released on the independent label F2Records. It is an English remixed version of the single My Sweet Darlin' and reached number one on the UK Club Play chart.

A collection of UK released singles was released in 2002 as U.K. Completion.

Track listing

CD

12" Vinyl

Notes

2001 singles
Hitomi Yaida songs
2001 songs
Songs written by Hitomi Yaida